Miroslav Borisovich Mitrofanov (born December 18, 1966 in Daugavpils, Latvia) is a Latvian Russian journalist and politician, Member of the 7th and 9th Saeima for For Human Rights in United Latvia. Co-chairman of ForHRUL (later renamed LRU) since 2011. He had been a member of the European Parliament since March 2018 until July 2019. In 2020, Mitrofanov was elected to the Riga City Council.

In 2020 Mitrofanov, alongside his party members Tatjana Ždanoka and Andrejs Mamikins, was included in the European Platform for Democratic Elections database of "biased observers" for backing disputed and rigged elections in Russia and occupied Ukraine.

References

External links

Profile at the European Parliament portal
Mitrofanov's CV

1966 births
Living people
Politicians from Daugavpils
Latvian people of Russian descent
Latvian Russian Union politicians
Deputies of the 7th Saeima
Deputies of the 9th Saeima
Latvian Russian Union MEPs
MEPs for Latvia 2014–2019
Latvian biologists
Latvian journalists
Writers from Daugavpils